Edward Seaga sports complex, commonly known as Railway Oval, is a multi-use stadium in Kingston, Jamaica.  It is used mostly for football matches. It serves as a home ground of Tivoli Gardens F.C. The stadium holds 5,000 people. In 1987 12,000 spectators attended a Jamaican cup match with Tivoli Gardens in the stadium.

External links
Aerial view

Football venues in Jamaica
Rugby league stadiums in Jamaica
Buildings and structures in Kingston, Jamaica